VDL Bus & Coach is a Netherlands based bus manufacturer. It is an amalgamation of several bus building companies within the VDL Groep. VDL Bus & Coach has manufacturing plants in Belgium and the Netherlands. By 2018 VDL Bus & Coach sold 500 electric buses.

History 
VDL Bus & Coach originates from the VDL Groep acquiring the following bus building companies in the Netherlands and Belgium:

 Berkhof (acquired in 1998, based in Valkenswaard, became VDL Bus Modules). Formerly part of Berkhof Jonckheere Groep, which VDL Groep acquired in 1998.
 Bova (acquired in 2003, based in Valkenswaard, became VDL Bus Valkenswaard).
 DAF Bus (acquired in 1993, based in Eindhoven, became VDL Bus Chassis). Originally named DAF Bus International after being separated from the truck-building business of DAF, it joined United Bus in 1990. It became a subsidiary of VDL Groep after United Bus collapsed in 1993. DAF Bus International was renamed VDL Bus International in September 2003. In 2008, VDL Bus International was renamed VDL Bus Chassis. 
 Hainje (acquired in 1998, based in Heerenveen, became VDL Bus Heerenveen). Formerly part of Berkhof Jonckheere Groep, which VDL Groep acquired in 1998.
 Jonckheere (acquired in 1998, based in Roeselare, became VDL Bus Roeselare). Formerly part of Berkhof Jonckheere Groep, which VDL Groep acquired in 1998.
 Kusters (acquired in 1998, based in Venlo, became VDL Bus Venlo). Formerly part of Berkhof Jonckheere Groep, which VDL Groep acquired in 1998.

Products

Current

Integral buses and coaches
 Citea
 Futura
 Midcity

Chassis
 SB180   - Low entry
 SB200   - Low entry
 SB230   - Low entry
 SBR230  - Low entry
 DB300   - Double deck
 TB2175  - Heavy duty (front engine)
 TBR2175 - Heavy duty (front engine)
 SB4000 - Intercity / Coach
 SBR4000 - Coach

Van conversions
 MidCity
 MidEuro

Historical (including DAF bus models)

Integral coaches and whole vehicles
 Lexio (interurban bus body on VDL SB4000 chassis, marketed as VDL Bova Lexio)
 Magiq (integral coach, ex Bova, renamed VDL Bova Magiq)
 Synergy (double deck coach body on VDL SBR4000 chassis, marketed as VDL Bova Synergy)

Chassis
 B62
 B1100
 B1300
 B1500
 B1502
 B1600
 DB250
 MB200
 MB205
 MB210
 MB230
 MBG200
 MBG205
 SB120
 SB201
 SB210
 SB220
 SB225
 SBR235
 SB250
 SB260   - Chassis modules for VDL Citea SLF
 SB1600
 SB1602
 SB1605
 SB2000
 SB2005
 SB2100
 SB2300
 SB2305
 SB2700
 SB2705
 SB2750
 SB3000
 SBG220
 SBR3000/SBR3015
 TB100
 TB102
 TB160
 TB163
 TB300
 TB2100
 TB2105

Gallery

References

External links
VDL Bus & Coach website

Paccar
VDL Groep
Bus manufacturers of the Netherlands